Terrible Creek is a  long 3rd order tributary to the Banister River in Halifax County, Virginia.

Course 
Terrible Creek rises about 1 mile southeast of Volens, Virginia in Halifax County and then flows generally southeast to join the Banister River about 0.5 miles north of Halifax.

Watershed 
Terrible Creek drains  of area, receives about 45.5 in/year of precipitation, has a wetness index of 398.10, and is about 54% forested.

See also 
 List of Virginia Rivers

References 

Rivers of Halifax County, Virginia
Rivers of Virginia